No Trace of Sin is a 1983 Portuguese drama film directed by José Fonseca e Costa. The film was selected as the Portuguese entry for the Best Foreign Language Film at the 56th Academy Awards, but was not accepted as a nominee.

Cast
 Victoria Abril as Maria da Luz / Lucilia
 Saul Santos as Cadete
 Armando Cortez as Tenente Sanches (as Armando Cortês)
 João Perry as Uncle Miguel
 Mário Viegas as Aspirante Henrique Sousa Andrade
 Inês de Medeiros as Rita (as Inês D'Almeida)

See also
 List of submissions to the 56th Academy Awards for Best Foreign Language Film
 List of Portuguese submissions for the Academy Award for Best Foreign Language Film

References

External links
 

1983 films
1983 drama films
Portuguese drama films
1980s Portuguese-language films